Flatware may refer to:
 Cutlery, eating implements (especially in the US)
 Flat tableware in "open" shapes, such as plates or dishes.